The year 1988 in architecture involved some significant architectural events and new buildings.

Events
 Hawkins\Brown architectural practice established in London.

Buildings and structures

Buildings opened

 March 13 – Seikan Tunnel beneath the Tsugaru Strait in Japan.
 May 9 – Parliament House, Canberra, Australia.
 September 25 – Aalto Theatre, Essen, Germany.
 October 10 – Cairo Opera House, Egypt.
 November 2 – Immaculate Conception Cathedral, Dili, Indonesia.
 December – Torre Picasso, in Madrid, Spain, by Minoru Yamasaki.
 date unknown – National Union of Mineworkers headquarters, Sheffield, England.

Buildings completed

 March 11 – Sultan Salahuddin Abdul Aziz Mosque, Selangor, Malaysia.
 July – 108 St Georges Terrace in Perth, Western Australia.
 Scotia Plaza in Toronto, Ontario, Canada.
 Bell Media Tower in Montreal, Canada.
 Canterra Tower in Calgary, Alberta.
 Wells Fargo Center in Minneapolis, Minnesota, United States.
 Pitampura TV Tower in New Delhi, India.
 Washington Mutual Tower in Seattle, Washington.
 Central Plaza 1, Brisbane, Queensland, Australia.
 One Kansas City Place, in Kansas City, Missouri, U.S.
 Bellevue Place, Hong Kong, designed by Rocco Design Architects.
 Richmond Riverside development in London, England, designed by Quinlan Terry.
 ERCO Technical Centre (Technisches Zentrum ERCO-Leuchten) in Lüdenscheid, Germany, designed by Uwe Kiessler.
 Storm water pumping station on the Isle of Dogs in London Docklands, designed by John Outram Associates.
 Causewayside Building, National Library of Scotland, Edinburgh, designed by Andrew Merrylees.
 Clovelly Visitor Centre in North Devon, England, designed by van Heyningen and Haward Architects.
 House for Janet Street-Porter, Clerkenwell, London, designed by Piers Gough of CZWG.

Awards
 Alvar Aalto Medal – Alvaro Siza
 Architecture Firm Award – Hartman-Cox Architects
 European Union Prize for Contemporary Architecture (Mies van der Rohe Prize) – Alvaro Siza for Banco Borges e Irmão, Vila do Conde
 Pritzker Prize – Oscar Niemeyer and Gordon Bunshaft
 RAIA Gold Medal – Romaldo Giurgola
 RIBA Royal Gold Medal – Richard Meier
 Thomas Jefferson Medal in Architecture – Romaldo Giurgola.
 Twenty-five Year Award – Washington Dulles International Airport Terminal Building

Deaths
 March – Tom Ellis, English architect (born 1911)
 March 12 – Bernard Rudofsky, Moravian-born American writer, architect, collector, teacher, designer, and social historian (born 1905)
 August 21 – Ray Eames, American architect and designer, partner of Charles Eames (born 1912)
 November 22 – Luis Barragán, Mexican architect (born 1902)

References

 
20th-century architecture